Robert William Lee (31 January 1927 – 10 June 2001) was an Australian rules footballer and administrator who played with West Adelaide in the South Australian National Football League (SANFL). He also represented the South Australian cricket team at first-class level in the Sheffield Shield.

Career
Lee managed 96 senior appearances for West Adelaide but it was his post playing contribution to South Australian football that he is remembered for. From 1966 to 1973 and then from 1979 to 1988 he served as the President of the West Adelaide Football Club. He was the SANFL's vice president in a long stint which began in 1981 and ended in 1999. Lee was also a League Director for 18 years, the SANFL Vice Patron, on the Management Committee for 12 years, Chairman of the SANFL Umpires Board for three years and served on the South Australian Football Commission. He also represented football in the state on a national level by standing in the National Australian Football Council as South Australia's representative, from 1981 to 1990 and spending three years at Chairman of Selectors. The Adelaide Football Club of the AFL appointed him to their Board in 1990 and he remained with the club until 1997.

In a brief cricket career he played three first-class cricket matches for South Australia in the late 1950s, as a right-hand batsman specialist batsman. Two of those matches were in the Sheffield Shield competition and in all he made 142 runs at 35.50. The only significant innings of Lee's career was in his debut match, against Tasmania at Hobart when he opened the batting and made 86.

An SANFL life member, Lee was inducted into the South Australian Football Hall of Fame in 2002.

References

External links
SA Football Hall of Fame - R W (Bob) Lee
Cricinfo: Bob Lee

1927 births
2001 deaths
West Adelaide Football Club players
West Adelaide Football Club administrators
South Australian National Football League administrators
South Australian Football Hall of Fame inductees
Australian cricketers
South Australia cricketers
Australian rules footballers from Adelaide
Cricketers from Adelaide